Michael Dee is a New Zealand born jockey who currently rides in Victoria, Australia.  He is notable for having ridden the winners of a number of Group One races.

Racing career

Michael's father, Richard Dee was a thoroughbred trainer. Michael started his riding career with the Hawkes Bay trainers Guy Lowry and Grant Cullen before moving to Kevin Myers in Wanganui. 
  
Dee had his first race-ride aboard Negotiate when placed 2nd at Stratford on 31 December 2012 for Kevin Myers. His first win was on the Adrian Bull gelding, Bamboo, at New Plymouth in a Rating 65 benchmark 1200m race on January 17, 2013.

During his initial riding career in New Zealand he achieved:
 2012/13 - 17 wins from 233 rides
 2013/14 - 65 wins from 728 rides
 2014/15 - 24 wins from 307 rides

In January 2015 Dee moved to Caulfield and completed his apprenticeship with Mick Price.

Michael Dee's first ride in the Melbourne Cup was on Gallante which finished last behind Rekindling in the 2017 race. He has also placed:

 5th on Persan for Ciaron Maher & David Eustace in the 2020 Melbourne Cup
 14th on Great House for Chris Waller in the 2021 Melbourne Cup.

Notable victories

The following are some of the major races won by Dee:

See also 
 Thoroughbred racing in Australia
 Thoroughbred racing in New Zealand

References

Living people
New Zealand jockeys
Year of birth missing (living people)